Qeshlaq-e Ayan Ali Barat (also Romanized as Qeshlāq-e Ayan Alī Barāt) is a village in Qeshlaq-e Jonubi Rural District, Qeshlaq Dasht District, Bileh Savar County, Ardabil Province, Iran. At the 2006 census, its population was 139, in 29 families.

References 

Towns and villages in Bileh Savar County